S. camerata may refer to:
 Sapheneutis camerata, a bagworm species
 Schistocerca camerata, a grasshopper species

See also 
 Camerata (disambiguation)